Praia do Forte is a long beach with a small village 80 km away from the city of Salvador, Bahia. The beach is known for its clear waters, white sand, natural pools, rivers and an ecological reserve of native flora and fauna.

Climate
Praia do forte features a tropical rainforest climate (Köppen: Af) with no discernible dry season due to no month having an average rainfall of 60 mm. Temperatures are relatively constant throughout the course of the year, Praia do forte's driest month of the year is September, where the village receives on average  of precipitation. Praia do forte's wettest months are between April and June when at least  of rain falls during each of these four months.
A distinctive feature of this place is that it stays sunny throughout the whole year, with the difference that in the months from May to July rainy season occurs. Because of this, activities and excursions in the area vary according to the season.

TAMAR project
The Projeto TAMAR (Portuguese for TAMAR Project, with TAMAR being an abbreviation of Tartarugas Marinhas, the Sea Turtles) is a Brazilian non-profit organization owned by the Chico Mendes Institute for Biodiversity Conservation.[1] The main objective of the project is to protect sea turtles from extinction in the Brazilian coastline.
The extremely worthwhile Tamar Project station, designed to protect endangered sea turtles, is located on the beach of Praia do Forte next to the church and lighthouse.

References
http://www.lonelyplanet.com/brazil/the-northeast/praia-do-forte/sights/other/tamar-project-station
http://www.praiadoforte.com.es/
 :es:Praia do Forte

External links

Beaches of Brazil
Geography of Bahia